David Jeffrey Frum (born June 30, 1960) is a Canadian-American political commentator and a former speechwriter for President George W. Bush, who is currently a senior editor at The Atlantic as well as an MSNBC contributor. In 2003, Frum authored the first book about Bush's presidency written by a former member of the administration. He has taken credit for the famous phrase "axis of evil" in Bush's 2002 State of the Union address.

Frum formerly served on the board of directors of the Republican Jewish Coalition, the British think tank Policy Exchange, the anti-drug policy group Smart Approaches to Marijuana, and as vice chairman and an associate fellow of the R Street Institute.

Frum is the son of Canadian journalist Barbara Frum.

Background
Born in Toronto, Ontario  to a Jewish family, Frum is the son of the late Barbara Frum (née Rosberg), a well-known, Niagara Falls, New York-born journalist and broadcaster in Canada, and the late Murray Frum, a dentist, who later became a real estate developer, philanthropist, and art collector. His father's parents migrated from Poland to Toronto in 1930. Frum's sister, Linda Frum, was a member of the Senate of Canada. He is married to the writer Danielle Crittenden, the stepdaughter of former Toronto Sun editor Peter Worthington. Frum also has an adopted brother, Matthew, from whom he is estranged. The couple has three children. He is a distant cousin of economist Paul Krugman.

At age 14, Frum was a campaign volunteer for an Ontario New Democratic Party candidate Jan Dukszta for the 1975 provincial election. During the hour-long bus/subway/bus ride each way to and from the campaign office in western Toronto, he read a paperback edition of Aleksandr Solzhenitsyn's The Gulag Archipelago, which his mother had given to him. "My campaign colleagues jeered at the book—and by the end of the campaign, any lingering interest I might have had in the political left had vanished like yesterday's smoke."

Education
He graduated from the University of Toronto Schools in 1978 where he was the school captain. At Yale University, he simultaneously earned Bachelor of Arts and Master of Arts degrees in history, graduating in 1982. He was in Directed Studies, a type of "Great Books" curriculum and a member of the Tory Party of the Yale Political Union.

Frum earned his Juris Doctor (J.D.) at Harvard Law School in 1987.

Career

Early career
After graduating from Harvard Law School, Frum returned to Toronto as an associate editor of Saturday Night. He was an editorial page editor of The Wall Street Journal from 1989 until 1992, and then a columnist for Forbes magazine in 1992–94. In 1994–2000, he worked as a senior fellow at the Manhattan Institute for Policy Research, as a contributing editor at neoconservative opinion magazine The Weekly Standard, and as a columnist for Canada's National Post. He worked also as a regular contributor for National Public Radio. In 1996, he helped organize the "Winds of Change" in Calgary, Alberta, an early effort to unite the Reform Party of Canada and the Progressive Conservative Party of Canada.

White House
Following the 2000 election of George W. Bush, Frum was appointed to a position as a speechwriter within the White House. He would later write that when he was first offered the job by chief Bush speechwriter Michael Gerson,

While still a Canadian citizen, he was one of the few foreign nationals working within the Bush White House. He filed for naturalization and took the oath of citizenship on September 11, 2007. Frum served as special assistant to the president for economic speechwriting from January 2001 to February 2002. Conservative commentator Robert Novak described Frum as an "uncompromising supporter of Israel" and "fervent supporter of Ariel Sharon's policies" during his time in the White House. Frum is credited by his wife with inventing the expression "Axis of Evil", which Bush introduced in his 2002 State of the Union address. During Frum's time at the White House, he was described by commentator Ryan Lizza as being part of a speechwriting brain trust that brought "intellectual heft" and considerable policy influence to the Bush Administration.

Shortly after the September 11 attacks, Frum hosted pseudonymous Muslim apostate and critic of Islam, Ibn Warraq at an hour-and-a-half lunch at the White House.

While serving in the Bush White House and afterward, Frum strongly supported the Iraq War. In later years, however, he would express regret for that endorsement, saying that it owed more to psychological and group identity factors than reasoned judgment:

"It's human nature to assess difficult questions, not on the merits, but on our feelings about the different 'teams' that form around different answers. To cite a painful personal experience: During the decision-making about the Iraq war, I was powerfully swayed by the fact that the proposed invasion of Iraq was supported by those who had been most right about the Cold War—and was most bitterly opposed by those who had been wrongest about the Cold War. Yet in the end, it is not teams that matter. It is results. As Queen Victoria's first prime minister bitterly quipped after a policy fiasco: 'What wise men had promised has not happened. What the damned fools predicted has actually come to pass.'"

He also later acknowledged that it remains unclear how the US "could have delivered better success in Iraq" in terms of replacing Saddam with a "more humane and peaceful" government.

Frum left the White House in February 2002. Commentator Robert Novak, appearing on CNN, claimed that Frum was dismissed because his wife had emailed friends, saying that her husband had invented the "axis of evil" phrase. Frum and the White House denied Novak's allegation.

Frum opposed the nomination of Harriet Miers for the Supreme Court of the United States, on the grounds that she was insufficiently qualified for the post, as well as insufficiently conservative.

American Enterprise Institute 

Shortly after leaving the White House, Frum took up a position as a fellow of the American Enterprise Institute, a neo-conservative think tank. During the early days of his stint there, Frum coauthored An End to Evil with Richard Perle, which was a bold presentation of the neoconservative view of global affairs and an apologia of the 2003 invasion of Iraq.

His position lasted from 2003 until March 25, 2010, when his paid position was terminated and he declined to accept the offer of a non-paying position. Frum later stated that he was asked to leave AEI because of his vocal criticism of the Republican party's no-holds-barred opposition to Obamacare.

Other activities after leaving the White House
In 2005, Frum faced a libel lawsuit filed by the Canadian chapter of the Council on American–Islamic Relations after he suggested in a column for the National Post that CAIR was sympathetic to terrorists. Frum first vowed to fight the lawsuit, but instead the paper published an editor's note acknowledging that "neither Sheema Khan nor the Council on American-Islamic Relations Canada advocates or promotes terrorism."
On October 11, 2007, Frum announced on his blog that he was joining Rudolph Giuliani's presidential campaign as a senior foreign policy adviser.

On November 16, 2008, The New York Times reported that Frum would be leaving National Review, where he was a contributing editor and online blogger. Frum announced to readers of his blog that he would be starting a new political website, NewMajority.com, describing it as "a group blog, featuring many different voices. Not all of them … conservatives or Republicans." He hoped the site would "create an online community that will be exciting and appealing to younger readers, a generation often repelled by today's mainstream conservatism." The website was launched on January 19, 2009. On October 31, 2009, its title was changed to FrumForum, to avoid confusion with other political organizations that used "New Majority" in their names. In 2012 it was merged into The Daily Beast, where his blog continued. Citing personal reasons shortly after the deaths of his father and father-in-law, Frum suspended his blog on June 3, 2013 but resumed writing for The Daily Beast in September 2013.

Frum joined The Atlantic as a senior editor in March 2014. During the 2014 Israel–Gaza conflict, Frum issued a series of tweets labeling as "fake" a photo of two blood-covered Palestinian youths bringing their father's body to a hospital in Khan Younis; the man had been killed in an Israeli airstrike. Frum apologized on The Atlantic. Frum was criticized by Washington Post media writer Erik Wemple and by fellow correspondent for The Atlantic, James Fallows, who termed Frum's tweets "a major journalistic error."

On November 2, 2016, he announced that he had voted for Hillary Clinton for President.

Books and writing
Frum's first book, Dead Right, was released in 1994. It "expressed intense dissatisfaction with supply-siders, evangelicals, and nearly all Republican politicians", according to a negative review by a Frum opponent, Robert Novak. Frank Rich of The New York Times described it as "the smartest book written from the inside about the American conservative movement," William F. Buckley, Jr. found it "the most refreshing ideological experience in a generation," and Daniel McCarthy of The American Conservative called it "a crisply written indictment of everything its author disliked about conservatism in the early '90s."

He is also the author of What's Right (1996) and How We Got Here (2000), a history of the 1970s, which "framed the 1970s in the shadow of World War II and Vietnam, suggesting, 'The turmoil of the 1970s should be understood … as the rebellion of an unmilitary people against institutions and laws formed by a century of war and the preparation for war.'" Michael Barone of U.S. News & World Report praised How We Got Here, noting that "more than any other book … it shows how we came to be the way we are." John Podhoretz described it as "compulsively readable" and a "commanding amalgam of history, sociology and polemic."

In January 2003 Frum released The Right Man: The Surprise Presidency of George W. Bush, the first insider account of the Bush presidency. As the title suggests, Frum also discussed how the events of September 11, 2001 redefined the country and the president: "George W. Bush was hardly the obvious man for the job. But by a very strange fate, he turned out to be, of all unlikely things, the right man." His book An End to Evil was co-written with Richard Perle. It provided a defense of the 2003 invasion of Iraq, and advocated regime change in Iran and Syria. It called for a tougher policy toward North Korea, and a tougher US stance against Saudi Arabia and other Islamic nations in order to "win the war on terror" (from the book's subtitle).

He published Comeback: Conservatism That Can Win Again  in 2008. In 2012, his book Why Romney Lost (And What The GOP Can Do About It), attributed Mitt Romney's defeat in the 2012 U.S. presidential election to an economic message out of touch with the concerns of middle-class Americans and to a backward-looking cultural message. Frum's first novel, Patriots, was published in April 2012. It is a political satire about the election and presidency of a fictional conservative American president. In 2018, Frum published Trumpocracy: The Corruption of the American Republic, about the dangers posed by the Trump presidency to American democracy. He was interviewed for the book on the New Books Network. In 2020, he published a second volume about the Trump era and its consequences, Trumpocalypse: Restoring American Democracy.

Appearances on public radio

Frum was a commentator for American Public Media's "Marketplace" from 2007 until his final appearance on October 12, 2011. Frum has made numerous appearances on the weekly radio program Left, Right & Center on KCRW, the National Public Radio affiliate in Santa Monica, California. On the KCRW program, Frum presented the conservative viewpoint.

Political views
Frum supported the 2003 invasion of Iraq. He helped write George W. Bush's famous "Axis of Evil" speech to describe the governments of Iraq, Iran and North Korea. Frum is a supporter of Israel. He opposed President Barack Obama's Iran nuclear deal. In 2009, Frum described his political beliefs as follows:
I'm a conservative Republican, have been all my adult life. I volunteered for the Reagan campaign in 1980. I've attended every Republican convention since 1988. I was president of the Federalist Society chapter at my law school, worked on the editorial page of The Wall Street Journal and wrote speeches for President Bush—not the 'Read My Lips' Bush, the 'Axis of Evil' Bush. I served on the Giuliani campaign in 2008 and voted for John McCain in November. I supported the Iraq War and (although I feel kind of silly about it in retrospect) the impeachment of Bill Clinton. I could go on, but you get the idea.

In 2010, Frum was involved in the formation of the centrist group No Labels as a "founding leader".

In June 2011, following the legalization of same-sex marriage in New York state, Frum's weekly column for CNN was titled "I was wrong about same-sex marriage." In it he described the evolution of his opinion from a "strong opponent" 14 years prior; while he had feared that its introduction would cause "the American family [to] become radically more unstable," he now feels that "the case against same-sex marriage has been tested against reality. The case has not passed its test." In 2013, Frum was a signatory to an amicus curiae brief submitted to the Supreme Court in support of same-sex marriage during the Hollingsworth v. Perry case.

In a 2013 opinion column for CNN, Frum discussed the need for a "Plan B On Guns" because of a lack of votes in Congress for gun control legislation. Frum specifically urged the commissioning of a surgeon general's report on firearms health effects on individual ownership (writing that "such a report would surely reach the conclusion that a gun in the home greatly elevates risks of suicide, lethal accident and fatal domestic violence"), and he called for Senate hearings regarding the practices of firearms manufacturers.  He compared these to hearings conducted in the 1990s about tobacco companies.

In 2014, Frum analyzed the role of Edward Snowden in Vladimir Putin's publicity program.

On May 15, 2017, he called on Donald Trump to resign the presidency during a time when the Trump campaign's willingness to accept Russian aid during the election brought about accusations that Trump had committed treason. Frum appeared on stage with Steve Bannon, Trump's former campaign CEO and White House Chief Strategist, in the November 2, 2018 edition of the Munk Debates in Toronto, ON., where they debated the future of populism in western politics.

In 2018, he wrote, "The advanced democracies have built the freest, most just, and best societies in human history. Those societies demand many improvements, for sure—incremental, practical reforms, with careful attention to unintended consequences. But not revolution. Not the burn-it-all-down fantasies of the new populists."

Frum is a proponent of immigration reform, arguing that "reducing immigration, and selecting immigrants more carefully" would lead to increased economic benefits and restore "the feeling of belonging to one united nation, responsible for the care and flourishing of all its people".

Presidential elections

Frum supported John McCain in the 2008 presidential election, writing "I vote for John McCain". In an article for National Review Online that he posted days before the 2008 election, he gave ten reasons why he was going to vote for McCain instead of Barack Obama. Frum had previously been a vocal critic of Republican presidential candidate McCain's choice of Sarah Palin as his running mate on the grounds that Palin was unqualified to assume the presidency. Speaking of Palin's performance during the campaign, Frum stated, "I think she has pretty thoroughly—and probably irretrievably—proven that she is not up to the job of being president of the United States." Nevertheless, he ultimately stated his support for Palin, writing "But on Tuesday, I will trust that she can learn. She has governed a state—and … it says something important that so many millions of people respond to her as somebody who incarnates their beliefs and values. At a time when the great American middle often seems to be falling further and further behind, there may be a special need for a national leader who represents and symbolizes that middle."

After the 2012 election, Frum said that Romney would have been "a really good president" but that he had allowed himself to be "twisted into pretzels" by the more extreme factions of the Republican Party who immediately abandoned him after he lost the election.

Never Trump
Frum stated that he voted for Hillary Clinton in the 2016 U.S. presidential election. He is identified with the Never Trump movement, Republicans who opposed the election of Donald Trump and continued to oppose Trump during his presidency. In October 2019 Frum called Trump "very, very guilty" of attempting  to influence Ukraine to announce an investigation into Trump's political opponent Joe Biden. During Trump's term, Frum wrote two books criticizing Trump, his policies, and his incompetence at governing: Trumpocracy: The Corruption of the American Republic and Trumpocalypse: Restoring American Democracy.

In 2022, when the Republican party prohibited its candidates from participating in future Presidential Debates, Frum attributed the decision to the "Trump Cinematic Universe," an involuted cartoon version of reality accessible to "[O]nly those conversant with the pro-Trump right's internal myths and legends."

Criticism of the Republican Party after 2008
In 2009, Frum denounced various anti-Obama conspiracy theories as "wild accusations and the paranoid delusions coming from the fever swamps".

In his blog, Frum described the Tea Party as "a movement of relatively older and relatively affluent Americans whose expectations have been disrupted by the worst economic crisis since the Great Depression. They are looking for an explanation of the catastrophe—and a villain to blame. They are finding it in the same place that (Michele) Bachmann and her co-religionists located it 30 years ago: a deeply hostile national government controlled by alien and suspect forces, with Barack Obama as their leader and symbol." He explained Bachmann's political views, some of which he called "paranoid": "It emerges from a religious philosophy that rejects the federal government as an alien instrument of destruction, ripping apart a Christian society. Bachmann's religiously grounded rejection of the American state finds a hearing with many more conventional conservatives radicalized by today's hard economic times."

On August 14, 2009, on Bill Moyers Journal, Frum challenged certain Republican political tactics in opposing health care and other Democratic initiatives as "outrageous," "dangerous," and ineffective. As Congress prepared to pass the Patient Protection and Affordable Care Act in March 2010, Frum again criticized the Republican strategy of refusing to negotiate with President Obama and congressional Democrats on health care reform, saying that it had resulted in the Republicans' "most crushing legislative defeat since the 1960s". Before making this statement, Frum had been associated with the American Enterprise Institute. He resigned from the AEI a few days later. Following the temporary withdrawal of a Republican effort to repeal the ACA in 2017, Frum wrote an article in the Atlantic in which he chastised fellow Republicans and conservatives for failing to take his advice to behave with moderation and humility.

In a September 2011 article, Tablet Magazine wrote: "as the Tea Party has come to dominate the GOP, Frum has been transformed in a remarkably short period of time from right-wing royalty to apostate" and quoted him as saying: "There's a style and a sensibility in the Republican Party right now that I find myself removed from, [but] you can do more good for the country by working for a better Republican Party than by leaving it to the extremists. What have they done to deserve that inheritance?"

Writing for New York magazine in November 2011, Frum described his reaction to fellow Republicans, who had distanced themselves from him, saying, "Some of my Republican friends ask if I've gone crazy. I say: Look in the mirror." He described the development of an "alternative reality" within which the party, conservative think-tanks, and right wing commentators operate from a set of lies about the economy and nonexistent threats to their traditional base of supporters. He expressed concern over the inability of moderate Republicans to criticize their conservative brethren, contrasting this to the 1960s split between moderate Ripon Republicans and conservative Goldwater Republicans, when moderates such as Michigan governor George Romney were publicly critical of the conservatives.

Non-political views
Frum considers himself "a not especially observant Jew". Alexander Hamilton and Abraham Lincoln are among his favorite historical figures. Marcel Proust is his favorite novelist.

Bibliography

Books

Critical studies and reviews of Frum's work
 Review of Trumpocracy.

See also
List of newspaper columnists

References

Further reading

External links 

Column archive at The Atlantic
Column archive (January 2010 - March 2015) at the National Post
Column archive (April 2012 - February 2013) at The Huffington Post
Frum Forum  (last updated in 2012)

1960 births
Living people
20th-century American journalists
20th-century American male writers
20th-century American non-fiction writers
20th-century Canadian journalists
20th-century Canadian male writers
20th-century Canadian non-fiction writers
21st-century American journalists
21st-century American male writers
21st-century American non-fiction writers
21st-century American novelists
21st-century Canadian journalists
21st-century Canadian male writers
21st-century Canadian novelists
American columnists
American Enterprise Institute
American foreign policy writers
American male non-fiction writers
American male bloggers
American bloggers
American male journalists
American people of Polish-Jewish descent
American political commentators
American political journalists
American political writers
American satirical novelists
American satirists
American speechwriters
American Zionists
The Atlantic (magazine) people
Canadian bloggers
Canadian columnists
Canadian emigrants to the United States
Canadian male journalists
Canadian male novelists
Canadian political journalists
Canadian political writers
Canadian people of American-Jewish descent
Canadian people of Polish-Jewish descent
Canadian satirists
Canadian Zionists
CNN people
George W. Bush administration personnel
Harvard Law School alumni
HuffPost writers and columnists
Jewish American novelists
Journalists from Washington, D.C.
Lawyers in Ontario
Manhattan Institute for Policy Research
MSNBC people
Members of the Steering Committee of the Bilderberg Group
National Post people
People associated with the 2008 United States presidential election
Washington, D.C., Republicans
The Weekly Standard people
Writers from Toronto
Yale College alumni
Criticism of Donald Trump
Jewish Canadian journalists
Yale Graduate School of Arts and Sciences alumni